The following is the List of the Roman Catholic dioceses of Iran.

List of dioceses

Ecclesiastical Province of Tehran 
Archdiocese of Tehran (Chaldean)

Ecclesiastical Province of Cilicia 
Eparchy of Ispahan (Armenian)

Ecclesiastical Province of Urmya 
Archdiocese of Urmya (Chaldean)
Diocese of Salmas (Chaldean)

Immediately Subject to the Holy See 
Archdiocese of Teheran-Isfahan (Latin)

Immediately Subject to the Patriarch 
Archeparchy of Ahwaz (Chaldean)

External links 
GCatholic.org.
Catholic-Hierarchy entry.

Iran
Catholic dioceses